Marley Angelina Canales (born November 16, 1997) is an American professional soccer player who plays as a midfielder for OL Reign of the National Women's Soccer League (NWSL).

Club career 
OL Reign drafted Canales in the 2022 NWSL Draft. She signed with the team in April 2022, and made her NWSL debut on May 1, 2022.

Honors
 with OL Reign
 NWSL Shield: 2022
 The Women's Cup: 2022

References

External links
 
 UCLA Bruins bio
 

Living people
1997 births
American women's soccer players
UCLA Bruins women's soccer players
OL Reign players
Soccer players from Salt Lake City
Women's association football midfielders
National Women's Soccer League players